TC, T.C., Tc, Tc, tc, tC, or .tc may refer to:

Arts and entertainment

Film and television
 Theodore "T.C." Calvin, a character on the TV series Magnum, P.I. and its reboot
 Tom Caron, American television host for New England Sports Network
 Top Cat, an animated sitcom named after the protagonist
 BBC Television Centre, a studio and office complex whose name is abbreviated to TC, and whose studios are numbered TC0-TC12

Music
 TC Smith, American singer, for TCR
 Tom Constanten (born 1944), American musician from the Grateful Dead
 Top Combine, a Mandopop boy band
 TC (musician), a British drum and bass producer and DJ

Games
 Transcendental Chess
 X3: Terran Conflict, a PC game
 T.C., an era designation in the Xenosaga game series

Organizations
 TC Electronic, a Danish manufacturer of studio equipment and guitar effects
 Air Tanzania (IATA code TC)
 Teachers College, Columbia University, a graduate school of education in New York City
 Telecom Cambodia, a telecom company in Cambodia
 Tierra Comunera, a Spanish political party
 Thompson Creek Metals Company Inc (NYSE: TC), a diversified mining company
 Transport Canada, a Canadian federal government department
 Trinity College (Connecticut), an American liberal arts college
 Tomball College, now Lone Star College-Tomball

People
 TC Clements, Michigan state representative
 Tony Currie (footballer) (born 1950), English footballer

Places
 The Republic of Turkey, from the Turkish name, Türkiye Cumhuriyeti
 Traverse City, Michigan, US
 Turks and Caicos Islands (ISO 3166-1 country code TC)

Science and technology

Biology and medicine
 Testicular cancer
 Therapeutic community, a treatment program for addictions, personality disorder or other mental problems
 Cytotoxic T-cells

Chemistry and physics
 Technetium, symbol Tc, a chemical element
 Temperature coefficient
 Critical temperature (Tc)
 Convective temperature (Tc)
 Curie temperature (Tc)
 Teracoulomb, an SI unit for electric charge equal to 1012 coulombs
 Tesla coil, a category of high-voltage discharge coils
 Tonnes of Carbon (tC)

Computing
 Turing complete
 .tc, the Internet country code top-level domain (ccTLD) for Turks and Caicos Islands
 TC (complexity), a complexity class
 Tc (Linux), a command-line utility used to configure network traffic control in the Linux kernel
 Take Command (command line interpreter), a command line interpreter by JP Software
 Telecine (copying), a form of digital transfer using a Telecine machine
 Teleconference
 TrueCrypt, a disk encryption software
 Trusted Computing, a scheme for adding additional controls on what computers may or may not do into hardware or software

Transportation
 TC, a Mazda piston engine
 Chrysler TC by Maserati, an automobile sold by Chrysler from 1989-1991
 Scion tC, a touring coupe made by Scion that's based on the Toyota Avensis
 Traction control system, an anti-slip automobile subsystem
 Turn coordinator, an aircraft instrument
 Transit center, a major transport hub for trains and buses

Other uses in science and technology
 Technical committee, see 
 Timecode, in video and audio production
 Tropical cyclone, also known as a hurricane, tropical storm, tropical depression, or typhoon
 Turbocharger, turbine-driven device that increases an internal combustion engine's power output

Sports
 TC (mascot), the mascot for the Minnesota Twins baseball team
 TC 2000, a series of races for touring cars which is held each year in Argentina
 TC Panther, the mascot of the Northern Iowa Panthers
 Total chances, a baseball fielding term
 Turismo Carretera, a popular stock car category in Argentina

Other uses
 Total Communication, a form of sign language
 Total cost, in economics and accounting
 Traffic collision, an automobile accident
 Trinity Cross, the highest national award in Trinidad and Tobago
 Type certificate, an aircraft document
 Traditional Chinese characters, Chinese characters in any character set that does not contain newly created characters or character substitutions performed after 1946
 United States Tax Court, a U.S. Article I federal trial court